Abdirisaq Ibrahim Mohamed "Attash", (born 1969, in Las Anod), is the Post and Telecommunications Minister of the autonomous region of Somaliland. A member of the Peace, Unity and Development Party, he has held his current office since August 2010. From 1981 to 1985, Attash attended secondary schools in Mogadishu, Somalia. He performed his mandatory in the military service from 1986 to 1987. He migrated to Europe in 1995, where he continued his education, studying in Denmark and England. He attended college at The Open University, and earned a Bachelor's Degree with honors in Social Sciences. He participated in the founding of the Nugaal University, the development in the Field of Education in the region of Sool, the development of health in Sool, and the reconciliation conference in Widhwidh. He is also the owner and founder of Ataash Hotel in Las Anod.

References

Somlailand President Appoints a Committee for Sool and Sanaag Conflict.

Living people
Alumni of the Open University
Somaliland politicians
Peace, Unity, and Development Party politicians
1969 births